Sant Boi de Lluçanès is a municipality in the comarca of Osona in 
Catalonia, Spain.

Although the municipality lies within the natural region of Lluçanès, it voted in 2015 not to join a proposed new comarca of that name, but the plan was put on hold due to insufficient support.

References

 Panareda Clopés, Josep Maria; Rios Calvet, Jaume; Rabella Vives, Josep Maria (1989). Guia de Catalunya, Barcelona: Caixa de Catalunya.  (Spanish).  (Catalan).

External links
 Government data pages 

Municipalities in Osona